Fort Monostor (also referred to as Fort Sandberg) is a fort is situated close to the city of Komárom, Hungary. It was built between 1850 and 1871 like part of the fortification system of Komárom.  After World War II the Soviets built the biggest ammunition storage in the Fortress of Monostor.  Thousands of wagons of ammunition were forwarded from the strictly guarded objects.  One of a series of forts in the area, Monostor is open to the public as a museum. It also hosts Europe Gate, a sculpture made of light-transmitting concrete.

See also 

 Komárom
 Komarno
 Komárno fortification system

References

External links
Fort Monostor Non-profit Organization (english version)
NEC ARTE NEC MARTE Non-profit organization (English version) See there Fortress Komárno in whole.

Monostor
Komárom
Infrastructure completed in 1871
Buildings and structures in Komárom-Esztergom County
Museums in Komárom-Esztergom County
Military and war museums in Hungary